The following is a list of notable people born in or associated with the Algerian region of Boumerdès Province within Kabylia.

People
The province was the birthplace of the following people.

A

 Abdelhafid Benchabla, Algerian boxer.
 , Algerian footballer.
 , Algerian politician.
 Abderrahmane Abdelli, Algerian artist.
 Abderrahmane Benhamida, Algerian politician.
 Abderrahmane Boushaki, Algerian leader.
 Abderrahmane Farès, Algerian politician.
 Abderrahmane Hammad, Algerian athlete.
 Abderrahman Ibrir, Algerian footballer.
 Adel Djerrar, Algerian footballer.
 , Algerian politician.
 , Algerian politician.
 Ahmed Mahsas, Algerian politician.
 Ali Boushaki, Algerian theologian.
 Ali Bouyahiaoui, Algerian militant.
 Ali Laskri, Algerian politician.
 Ali Rial, Algerian footballer.
 Amine ibn El Boushaki, Algerian judoka.

B
 Bachir Boudjelid, Algerian footballer.
 Boualem Boukacem, Algerian artist.
 Brahim Boushaki, Algerian theologian.

C
 Cheikh Boumerdassi, Algerian theologian.

D
 , Algerian politician.
 , Algerian artist.

F
 , Algerian academician.
 Fatma Zohra Zamoum, Algerian writer.
 Feriel Boushaki, Algerian artist.
 Firmus, Berber leader.
 Fodil Mezali, Algerian journalist.

G
 Gildo, Berber leader.

H

 Habib Ayyoub, Algerian writer.
 Hocine Mezali, Algerian journalist.
 Hocine Soltani, Algerian boxer.
 Hocine Ziani, Algerian artist.

K

L

 Lamine Abid, Algerian footballer.
 Lounés Bendahmane, Algerian footballer.
 Lyès Deriche, Algerian leader.

M

 Maamar Bettayeb, Algerian academician.
 Mascezel, Berber leader.
 Mohamed Aïchaoui, Algerian journalist.
 Mohamed Allalou, Algerian boxer.
 Mohamed Arkab, Algerian politician.
 Mohamed ben Zamoum, Algerian leader.
 , Algerian politician.
 Mohamed Boumerdassi, Algerian artist.
 , Algerian politician.
 Mohamed Bouyahiaoui, Algerian militant.
 Mohamed Cherak, Algerian journalist.
 Mohamed Deriche, Algerian politician.
 , Algerian academician.
 Mohamed Flissi, Algerian boxer.
 Mohamed Hassaïne, Algerian journalist.
 , Algerian politician.
 Mohamed Mechkarini, Algerian militant.
 Mohamed Missouri, Algerian boxer.
 , Algerian academician.
 Mohamed Rahmoune, Algerian politician.
 Mohamed Seghir Boushaki, Algerian politician.
 Mokhtar Hasbellaoui, Algerian academician.
 Mustapha Ishak Boushaki, Algerian academician.
 Mustapha Toumi, Algerian songwriter.

N
 Nadia Boumerdassi, Algerian artist.
 Noureddine Melikechi, Algerian physicist.
 , Berber leader.

O
 Omar ben Zamoum, Algerian leader.
 Omar Fetmouche, Algerian artist.
 Othmane Senadjki, Algerian journalist.

R

 , Algerian politician.
 Rachid Deriche, Algerian academician.
 Rachid Mimouni, Algerian writer.
 Rachid Nadji, Algerian footballer.
 Raïs Hamidou, Algerian privateer.
 , Algerian judokate.
 Rezki Zerarti, Algerian artist.

S

 , Algerian politician.
 , Algerian politician.
 , Algerian politician.
 Shahnez Boushaki, Algerian basketball player.
 Sidi Abd al-Rahman al-Tha'alibi, Algerian theologian.
 , Algerian theologian.
 Sidi Boushaki, Algerian theologian.
 , Algerian marathon runner.
 , Algerian footballer.

T
 , Algerian academician.

W
 Walid Derrardja, Algerian footballer.

Y
 Yahia Boushaki (Shahid), Algerian politician.

Z
 Zinedine Ferhat, Algerian footballer.

See also
List of Algerian people
List of Algerian artists
List of Algerian muftis
List of Algerian musicians
List of Algerian women artists
List of Algerian women writers
List of Algerian writers
List of Muslim saints of Algeria

References

External links
Official website of the Boumerdès Province